The glottis is the opening between the vocal folds (the rima glottidis). The glottis is crucial in producing vowels and voiced consonants.

Etymology
From Ancient Greek γλωττίς (glōttís), derived from γλῶττα (glôtta), variant of γλῶσσα (glôssa, "tongue").

Function

Phonation

As the vocal folds vibrate, the resulting vibration produces a "buzzing" quality to the speech, called voice or voicing or pronunciation.

Sound production that involves moving the vocal folds close together is called glottal. English has a voiceless glottal transition spelled "h". This sound is produced by keeping the vocal folds spread somewhat, resulting in non-turbulent airflow through the glottis. This is the case with the Klingon language developed for the science fiction series Star Trek, which treats the glottal stop as its own letter, represented by the apostrophe. 

Skilled players of the Australian didgeridoo restrict their glottal opening in order to produce the full range of timbres available on the instrument.

The vibration produced is an essential component of voiced consonants as well as vowels. If the vocal folds are drawn apart, air flows between them causing no vibration, as in the production of voiceless consonants.

The glottis is also important in the valsalva maneuver.
 Voiced consonants include 
 Voiceless consonants include

Additional images

References

External links

 States of the Glottis (Esling & Harris, University of Victoria)
 Universität Stuttgart Speech production

Phonetics
Human head and neck
Human voice
Larynx
Speech organs